Jean McConville (née Murray; 7 May 1934 – December 1972) was a woman from Belfast, Northern Ireland, who was kidnapped and murdered by the Provisional Irish Republican Army (IRA) and secretly buried in County Louth in the Republic of Ireland in 1972 after being accused by the IRA of passing information to British forces.

In 1999, the IRA acknowledged that it had killed McConville and eight others of the "Disappeared". It claimed she had been passing information about republicans to the British Army in exchange for money and that a transmitter had been found in her flat. A report by the Police Ombudsman found no evidence for this or other rumours.

Before the Troubles, the IRA had a policy of killing informers within its own ranks. From the start of the conflict the term informer was also used for civilians who were suspected of providing information on paramilitary organisations to the security forces. Other Irish republican and loyalist paramilitaries also carried out such killings. As she was a widowed mother of ten, the McConville killing was particularly controversial. Her body was not found until 2003, and the crime has not been solved. The Police Ombudsman found that the Royal Ulster Constabulary (RUC) did not begin to investigate the disappearance properly until 1995.

Biography
Jean Murray was born on 7 May 1934 to a Protestant family in East Belfast but converted after marrying Arthur McConville, a Catholic former British Army soldier, with whom she had ten children. After being intimidated out of a Protestant district by loyalists in 1969, the McConville family moved to West Belfast's Divis Flats in the Lower Falls Road. Arthur died from cancer in January 1972.

At the time of her death, Jean McConville lived at 1A St Jude's Walk, which was part of the Divis Flats complex. This was an IRA stronghold, from which attacks were regularly launched against the British Army and Royal Ulster Constabulary (RUC). Since the death of her husband, she had been raising their ten children, who were aged between six and twenty. Their son Robbie was a member of the Official IRA and was interned in Long Kesh at the time of her death. He defected to the Irish National Liberation Army (INLA) in 1974.

Killing
In the months leading up to her death, tension and suspicion grew between McConville and her neighbours. One night shortly before her disappearance, she was allegedly attacked after leaving a bingo hall and warned to stop giving information to the British Army. According to police records, on 29 November 1972 a British Army unit found a distressed woman wandering in the street. She told them her name was McConville and that she had been attacked and warned to stop informing. One of McConville's children claimed she was kidnapped the night after this incident, but others gave the date of the kidnapping as 7 December.

On the night of her disappearance, four young women took McConville from her home at gunpoint, and she was driven to an unknown location. Dolours Price claimed that she was one of those involved in driving her across the border. McConville was killed by a gunshot to the back of the head;  there was no evidence of any other injuries to her body.
Her body was secretly buried across the border on Shelling Hill Beach (also known as Templetown Beach) at the south-eastern tip of the Cooley Peninsula in the north of County Louth, about 50 miles from her home. The place of her death is uncertain.

Although no group admitted responsibility for her disappearance, there were rumours that the IRA had killed her for being an informer. Another rumour is that she was killed because neighbours claimed they saw her helping a badly wounded British soldier outside her home; McConville's children say they recall her helping a wounded British soldier some time before their father died in January 1972. In a 2014 interview published in the Sunday Life, former Irish republican Evelyn Gilroy claimed the person who had tended to the soldier was her [Gilroy's] sister.

The IRA did not admit involvement until after the signing of the Good Friday Agreement. It claimed she was killed because she was passing information about republicans to the British Army. Former IRA member Brendan Hughes claimed the IRA had searched her flat some time before her death and found a radio transmitter, which they confiscated. He and other former republicans interrogated her and claimed she admitted the British Army was paying her for information about republicans. Hughes claims that, because of her circumstances, they let her go with a warning. However, he claims when the IRA found she had resumed working for the British Army, it decided to "execute" her.

Usually the bodies of informers were left in public as a warning, but the IRA secretly buried McConville, apparently because she was a widowed mother of ten. The IRA had first done this two months earlier, when it killed and buried two IRA members who were alleged to be working undercover for the British Military Reaction Force (MRF).

Aftermath
After her disappearance, McConville's seven youngest children, including six-year-old twins, survived on their own in the flat, cared for by their 15-year-old sister Helen. According to them, the hungry family was visited three weeks later by a stranger, who gave them McConville's purse, with 52 pence and her three rings in it.

On 16 January 1973, the story of the abduction appeared on the front page of the Belfast Telegraph, under the headline "Snatched mother missing a month". The following day, the children were interviewed on the BBC television programme Scene Around Six. The children reported to the social services, and were immediately brought into local council care. The family was split up by social services. Among the consequences of the killing, McConville's orphaned son Billy was sent to De La Salle Brothers
Boys' Home, Rubane House, Kircubbin, County Down, notorious for child abuse; he testified in 2014 to the Northern Ireland Historical Institutional Abuse Inquiry, describing repeated sexual and physical abuse, and starvation, saying "Christians looking after young boys – maybe they were Christians, but to me they were devils disguised in that uniform."

Within two days of her kidnapping, one of her sons reported the incident to the RUC and the British Army. However, the Police Ombudsman did not find any trace of an investigation into the kidnapping during the 1970s or 1980s. An officer told the Ombudsman that CID investigations in that area of Belfast at that time were "restricted to the most serious cases". On 2 January 1973, the RUC received two pieces of information stating: "it is rumoured that Jean McConville had been abducted by the [IRA] because she is an informer".

In March 1973, information was received from the British Army, saying the kidnapping was an elaborate hoax and that McConville had left of her own free will. As a result, the RUC refused to accept that McConville was missing, preferring to believe an anonymous tip that she had absconded with a British soldier. The first investigation into her kidnapping appears to have taken place in 1995, when a team of RUC detectives was established to review the cases of all those who were thought to have been kidnapped during the conflict.

In 1999, the IRA gave information on the whereabouts of her body. This prompted a prolonged search, co-ordinated by the Garda Síochána, the Republic of Ireland's police force, but no body was found. On the night of 26 August 2003, a storm washed away part of the embankment supporting the west side of Shelling Hill Beach car park, near the site of previous searches. This exposed the body. On 27 August, it was found by passersby while they were walking on Shelling Hill Beach (also known as Templetown Beach) in County Louth, at the south-eastern tip of the Cooley Peninsula. McConville was subsequently reburied beside her husband Arthur in Holy Trinity Graveyard in Lisburn.

Investigation

Police Ombudsman's report
In April 2004 the inquest into McConville's death returned a verdict of unlawful killing.

In 2006 the Police Ombudsman for Northern Ireland, Nuala O'Loan, published a report about the police's investigation of the murder. It concluded that the RUC did not investigate the murder until 1995, when it carried out a minor investigation. It found no evidence that she had been an informer, but recommended the British Government go against its long-standing policy regarding informers and reveal whether she was one. Journalist Ed Moloney called for the British Government to release war diaries relating to the Divis Flats area at the time. War diaries are usually released under the thirty-year rule, but those relating to Divis at the time of McConville's death are embargoed for almost ninety years.

The police have since apologised for its failure to investigate her abduction. In January 2005, Sinn Féin party chairman Mitchel McLaughlin claimed that the killing of McConville was not a crime, saying that she had been executed as a spy in a war situation. This prompted Irish journalist Fintan O'Toole to write a rebuttal, arguing that the abduction and extrajudicial killing of McConville was clearly a "war crime by all accepted national and international standards". The IRA has since issued a general apology, saying it "regrets the suffering of all the families whose loved ones were killed and buried by the IRA".

PSNI investigation and Boston College tapes
In August 2006, the Chief Constable of the Police Service of Northern Ireland (PSNI), Sir Hugh Orde, stated that he was not hopeful anyone would be brought to justice over the murder, saying "[in] any case of that age, it is highly unlikely that a successful prosecution could be mounted."

Boston College had launched an oral history project on the Troubles in 2001. It recorded interviews with republicans and loyalists about their involvement in the conflict, on the understanding that the tapes would not be released until after their deaths. Two of the republican interviewees, Brendan Hughes and Dolours Price, both now deceased, admitted they were involved in McConville's kidnapping. Both became diehard opponents of the Good Friday Agreement and Sinn Féin's support of it. They saw Sinn Féin president Gerry Adams as a traitor for negotiating the agreement and persuading the IRA to end its campaign.

In 2010, after Hughes's death, some of his statements were published in the book Voices from the Grave. He claimed McConville had admitted being an informer, and that Adams  ordered her disappearance. In a 2010 newspaper interview, Price also claimed Adams ordered her to participate in McConville's kidnapping. Price, who died in 2013, said she gave the interviews as revenge against Adams. Former republican prisoner Evelyn Gilroy, who lived near McConville, claimed Adams was an IRA commander and the only person who could have ordered the killing.<ref>"'Arrest Gerry Adams now' - former republican prisoner breaks her silence on IRA murder of Jean McConville" , The Belfast Telegraph, 24 April 2014; accessed 5 May 2014.</ref>

Adams has denied any role in the death of McConville. He said "the killing of Jean McConville and the secret burial of her body was wrong and a grievous injustice to her and her family".

In 2011, the PSNI began a legal bid to gain access to the tapes. Acting on a request from the PSNI, the United States Justice Department tried to force Boston College to hand them over. Boston College had promised those interviewed that the tapes would not be released until after their deaths, and other interviewees said they feared retribution if the tapes were released. Following a lengthy court battle, the PSNI was given transcripts of interviews by Hughes and Price.

2014 arrests
In March and April 2014, the PSNI arrested a number of people over the kidnapping and killing of Jean McConville. Ivor Bell, former IRA Chief of Staff, was arrested in March 2014. Shortly afterwards, he was charged with aiding and abetting in her murder."Pensioner bailed over McConville murder" . UTV News. 26 March 2014; accessed 5 May 2014. In April, the PSNI arrested three people who were teenagers at the time of the kidnapping: a 56-year-old man and two women, aged 57 and 60. All were released without charge."Further arrests over McConville murder" , UTV News, 17 April 2014; accessed 5 May 2014.

Following Bell's arrest in March, there was media speculation that police would want to question Gerry Adams due to the claims made by Hughes and Price. Adams maintained he was not involved, but had his solicitor contact the PSNI to find whether they wanted to question him. On 30 April, after being contacted by the PSNI, Adams voluntarily arranged to be interviewed at Antrim PSNI Station. He was arrested and questioned for four days before being released without charge. A file was sent to the Public Prosecution Service (PPS) to decide whether further action should be taken, but there was "insufficient evidence" to charge him.

The arrest took place during an election campaign. Sinn Féin claimed that the timing of the arrest was politically motivated; an attempt to harm the party's chances in the upcoming elections. Alex Maskey said it was evidence of a "political agenda [...] a negative agenda" by elements of the PSNI.

Jean McConville's family had campaigned for the arrest of Adams over the murder. Her son Michael said: "Me and the rest of my brothers and sisters are just glad to see the PSNI doing their job. We didn't think it would ever take place [Mr Adams' arrest], but we are quite glad that it is taking place." In a later interview on the Today programme on BBC Radio 4, he stated that he knew the names of those who had abducted and killed his mother, but that: "I wouldn't tell the police [PSNI]. If I told the police now a thing, me or one of my family members or one of my children would get shot by those [IRA] people. It's terrible that we know those people and we can't bring them to justice."

2018
Patrick Radden Keefe's 2018 book Say Nothing: A True Story of Murder and Memory in Northern Ireland'' focuses on the history of the Troubles starting from McConville's death. According to Keefe, Dolours Price told Ed Moloney and Anthony McIntyre that three IRA volunteers were present at McConville's killing: former Unknowns commander Pat McClure, Price and a third volunteer whom Price alleged fired the fatal shot. However, Moloney and McIntyre refused to tell Keefe who this person was, as the volunteer was still alive at the time. Nevertheless, Keefe claimed to have identified the IRA volunteer who pulled the trigger as Dolours's sister, Marian.

See also
Columba McVeigh
Disappearance of Peter Wilson
Gerard Evans
Independent Commission for the Location of Victims' Remains
Internal Security Unit
List of kidnappings
Murder of Gareth O'Connor
Murder of Thomas Oliver
Robert Nairac
Thomas Murphy (Irish republican)

References

External links
"Statement on the Abduction and Killing of Mrs Jean McConville in December 1972", (dated 8 July 2006) by P O’Neill, Irish Republican Publicity Bureau, Dublin

1970s missing person cases
1972 murders in the United Kingdom
1972 in Northern Ireland
Deaths by firearm in Northern Ireland
Enforced disappearances in Northern Ireland
Missing person cases in Ireland
Unsolved murders in the United Kingdom
Terrorism deaths in Northern Ireland
Paramilitary punishment attacks in Northern Ireland
History of County Louth